Buchan and Ivey v Secretary of State for Trade and Industry [1997] IRLR 80 is a UK insolvency law and labour law case, concerning the protection of employees' salaries on their employer's insolvency.

Facts
Two directors held the company's shares. They made a claim against the National Insurance Fund, for statutory redundancy under the Employment Protection (Consolidation) Act 1978 (now the Employment Rights Act 1996 section 160). The Employment Tribunal held that because directors could block decisions at board level, including decisions over their dismissal, they were not employees.

Judgment
Mummery J for the Employment Appeal Tribunal held the purpose of the legislation is not to help people whose businesses have failed. Therefore, he upheld the tribunal, that the directors could not claim reimbursement from National Insurance.

See also

UK insolvency law
UK labour law

Notes

References

United Kingdom company case law
Employment Appeal Tribunal cases
1997 in case law
1997 in British law